The Chronicle of Amadi (or Istoria del regno di Cipro, 'History of the kingdom of Cyprus') is an anonymous chronicle written around 1520 in Italian prose with some Venetian traits that detailed the history of Cyprus from the Byzantine Emperor Heraclius to the wedding of King John II with Helena Palaiologina on 3 February 1441. It was published in the original Italian in 1891 by René de Mas Latrie, son of French historian Louis de Mas Latrie and has been recently published in an English translation from the Italian by Nicolas Coureas and Peter Edbury.

Editions
Chroniques d'Amadi et de Strambaldi. Publiées par M. René de Mas Latrie. Premier partie Chronicle d'Amadi 1891

References 

History of Cyprus
Italian chronicles